is a passenger railway station  located in the city of  Takarazuka Hyōgo Prefecture, Japan. It is operated by the private transportation company Hankyu Railway.

Lines

Station layout
The station two elevated island platform serving four tracks, with the station building underneath. The effective length of the platform is for 10 cars. The inner two lines (Lines 2 and 3) are the main lines, and the outer two lines (Lines 1 and 4) are side tracks. The latter is mainly used by trains that start and end at this station.

Platforms

Adjacent stations

History
Hibarigaoka-Hanayashiki Station opened on January 16, 1961.

Passenger statistics
In fiscal 2016, the station was used by an average of 10,010 passengers daily

Surrounding area
Takarazuka City Hall Hibarigaoka Branch Office
Hibarigaoka Gakuen Elementary School
Hibarigaoka Gakuen Junior and Senior High School

See also
List of railway stations in Japan

References

External links 

 Hibarigaoka-Hanayashiki Station official home page 

Railway stations in Hyōgo Prefecture
Hankyu Railway Takarazuka Line
Stations of Hankyu Railway
Railway stations in Japan opened in 1961
Takarazuka, Hyōgo